Genetic counseling is the process of investigating individuals and families affected by or at risk of genetic disorders to help them understand and adapt to the medical, psychological and familial implications of genetic contributions to disease. This field is considered necessary for the implementation of genomic medicine. The process integrates:

 Interpretation of family and medical histories to assess the chance of disease occurrence or recurrence
 Education about inheritance, testing, management, prevention, resources
 Counseling to promote informed choices, adaptation to the risk or condition and support in reaching out to relatives that are also at risk

History 
The practice of advising people about inherited traits began around the turn of the 20th century, shortly after William Bateson suggested that the new medical and biological study of heredity be called "genetics". Heredity became intertwined with social reforms when the field of modern eugenics took form. Although initially well-intentioned, ultimately the movement had disastrous consequences; many states in the United States had laws mandating the sterilization of certain individuals, others were not allowed to immigrate and by the 1930s these ideas were accepted by many other countries including in Germany where euthanasia for the "genetically defective" was legalized in 1939.  This part of the history of genetics is at the heart of the now "non directive" approach to genetic counseling.

Sheldon Clark Reed coined the term genetic counseling in 1947 and published the book Counseling in Medical Genetics in 1955. Most of the early genetic counseling clinics were run by non-medical scientists or by those who were not experienced clinicians. With the growth in knowledge of genetic disorders and the appearance of medical genetics as a distinct specialty in the 1960s, genetic counseling progressively became medicalized, representing one of the key components of clinical genetics. It was not, though, until later that the importance of a firm psychological basis was recognized and became an essential part of genetic counseling, the writings of Seymour Kessler making a particular contribution to this. The first master's degree genetic counseling program in the United States was founded in 1969 at Sarah Lawrence College in Bronxville, New York. In 1979, the National Society of Genetic Counselors (NSGC) was founded and led by the first president, Audrey Heimler.

Detection and early processes 
Diagnostic testing occurs when an individual is showing signs or symptoms associated with a specific condition. Genetic testing can be used to arrive at a definitive diagnosis in order to provide better prognosis as well as medical management and/or treatment options. Testing can reveal conditions can be mild or asymptomatic with early treatment, as opposed to debilitating without treatment (such as phenylketonuria). Genetic tests are available for a number of genetic conditions, including but not limited to: Down syndrome, sickle cell disease, Tay–Sachs disease, muscular dystrophy. Establishing a genetic diagnosis can provide information to other at-risk individuals in the family.

Any reproductive risks (e.g. a chance to have a child with the same diagnosis) can also be explored after a diagnosis. Many disorders cannot occur unless both the mother and father pass on their genes, such as cystic fibrosis; this is known as autosomal recessive inheritance. Other autosomal dominant diseases can be inherited from one parent, such as Huntington disease and DiGeorge syndrome. Yet other genetic disorders are caused by an error or mutation occurring during the cell division process (e.g. aneuploidy) and are not hereditary.

Screening tests are often used prior to diagnostic testing, designed to separate people according to a fixed characteristic or property, with the intention of detecting early evidence of disease. For example, if a screening test during a pregnancy (such as maternal blood screening or ultrasound) reveals a risk of a health issue or genetic condition, patients are encouraged to receive genetic counseling to learn additional information regarding the suspected condition. A discussion of the management, therapy and treatments available for the conditions may take place; the next step may differ depending on the severity of the condition and range from during pregnancy to after delivery. Patients may decline additional screening and testing, elect to proceed to diagnostic testing, or pursue further screening tests to refine the risk during the pregnancy.

Presymptomatic or predictive testing occurs when an individual knows of a specific diagnosis (typically adult onset) in their family and has other affected relatives, but they themselves do not manifest any clinical findings at the time when they seek testing. The decision about whether or not to proceed with presymptomatic testing should entail a thoughtful approach and consideration of various medical, reproductive, social, insurance, and financial factors, with no "right" or "wrong" answer. Availability of treatment and medical management options for each specific diagnosis, as well as the genetics and inheritance pattern of the particular condition should be reviewed as inherited conditions can have reduced penetrance.

Insurance and legal issues should also be discussed during genetic counseling. There are laws in the United States such as GINA (Genetic Information Non-discrimination Act) and ACA that provide certain protections against discrimination for individuals with genetic diagnoses.

Approach and session overview

Approach 
There are different approaches to genetic counseling. The reciprocal-engagement model of genetic counseling practice includes tenets, goals, strategies, and behaviors for addressing patients' genetic concerns. Some counselors favor a psycho-educational approach while others incorporate more psycho-therapeutic techniques. Genetic counseling is psycho-educational as patients "learn how genetics contributes to their health risks and then process what this means and how it feels."

Whether the process of genetic counseling is a form of psychotherapy is up for debate. The relationship between the client and counselor is similar as are the goals of the sessions. As a psychotherapist aims to help his client improve his wellbeing, a genetic counselor also helps his client to address a "situational health threat that similarly threatens client wellbeing". Due to the lack of studies which compare genetic counseling to the practice of psychotherapy, it is hard to say with certainty whether genetic counseling can be "conceptualized as a short-term, applied, specific type of psychotherapy". However, there few existing studies suggest that genetic counseling falls "significantly short of psychotherapeutic counseling" because genetic counseling sessions primarily consist of the distribution of information without much emphasis placed on explaining any long-term impacts to the client.

Structure 
The goals of genetic counseling are to increase understanding of genetic diseases, discuss disease management options and explain the risks and benefits of testing. Counseling sessions focus on giving vital, unbiased information and non-directive assistance in the patient's decision-making process. Seymour Kessler, in 1979, first categorized sessions in five phases: an intake phase, an initial contact phase, the encounter phase, the summary phase, and a follow-up phase. The intake and follow-up phases occur outside of the actual counseling session. The initial contact phase is when the counselor and families meet and build rapport. The encounter phase includes dialogue between the counselor and the client about the nature of screening and diagnostic tests. The summary phase provides all the options and decisions available for the next step. If patients wish to go ahead with testing, an appointment is organized and the genetic counselor acts as the person to communicate the results. Result delivery can happen both in person or via phone. Often counselors will call out results to avoid patients having to come back in as results can take weeks to be processed. If further counseling is needed in a more personal setting, or it is determined that additional family members should be tested, a secondary appointment can be made.

Support 
Genetic counselors provide supportive counseling to families, serve as patient advocates and refer individuals and families to community or state support services. They serve as educators and resource people for other health care professionals and for the general public. Many engage in research activities related to the field of medical genetics and genetic counseling. When communicating increased risk, counselors anticipate the likely distress and prepare patients for the results. Counselors help clients cope with and adapt to the emotional, psychological, medical, social, and economic consequences of the test results.

Each individual considers their family needs, social setting, cultural background, and religious beliefs when interpreting their risk. Clients must evaluate their reasoning to continue with testing at all. Counselors are present to put all the possibilities in perspective and encourage clients to take time to think about their decision. When a risk is found, counselors frequently reassure parents that they were not responsible for the result. An informed choice without pressure or coercion is made when all relevant information has been given and understood.

After counseling for other hereditary conditions, the patient may be presented with the option of having genetic testing. In some circumstances no genetic testing is indicated, other times it may be useful to begin the testing process with an affected family member. The genetic counselor also reviews the advantages and disadvantages of genetic testing with the patient.

Outcomes 
The most commonly measured genetic counseling outcomes included knowledge, anxiety or distress, satisfaction, perceived risk, genetic testing (intentions or receipt), health behaviors, and decisional conflict. Results suggest that genetic counseling can lead to increased knowledge, perceived personal control, positive health behaviors, and improved risk perception accuracy as well as decreases in anxiety, cancer-related worry, and decisional conflict.

Sub-specialties

Adult genetics 
Adult or general genetics clinics serve patients who are diagnosed with genetic conditions that begin to show signs or symptoms in adulthood. Many genetic conditions have varying ages of onset, ranging from an infantile form to an adult form. Genetic counseling can facilitate the decision-making process by providing the patient/family with education about the genetic condition as well as the medical management options available to individuals at risk of developing the condition. Having the genetic information of other members of the family opens the door to asking important questions about the pattern of inheritance of specific disease‐causing mutations. Whilst there is a wealth of literature that describes how families communicate information surrounding single genes, there is very little which explores the experience of communication about family genomes. Adult-onset disorders may overlap multiple specialties.

ART/Infertility genetics 
Genetic counseling is an integral part of the process for patients utilizing preimplantation genetic testing (PGT), formerly called preimplantation genetic diagnosis. There are three types of PGT and all require in vitro fertilization (IVF) using assisted reproductive technology (ART). PGT-M, for monogenic disorders, involves testing embryos for a specific condition before it is implanted into the mother. This technique is currently being done for disorders with childhood onset, such as Cystic Fibrosis, Tay-Sachs and Muscular Dystrophy, as well as adult-onset conditions, including Huntington's Disease, Hereditary Breast and Ovarian Cancer Syndrome, and Lynch Syndrome. PGT-SR, for structural rearrangements, involves testing embryos to establish a pregnancy unaffected by a structural chromosomal abnormality (translocation). PGT-A, for aneuploidy, was formerly called preimplantation genetic screening, and involved testing embryos to identify any de novo aneuploidy. The indications to carry out PGT-A are: previous aneuploidy in the couple, implantation failure, recurrent miscarriage, severe male factor or advanced maternal age. Finally, PGT seems to be: safe for the embryo, trustable in the diagnosis, more efficient from the reproductive point of view and cost-effective.

Genetic counseling can also involve medical evaluation and clinical work-up for couples with infertility and/or recurrent pregnancy loss, as these histories can be associated with parental chromosome aberrations (such as inversions or translocations) and other genetic conditions.

Cardiovascular genetics 
A rapidly expanding field in genetic counseling is cardiovascular genetics. More than 1 in 200 people have an inherited cardiovascular disease. Hereditary cardiac conditions range from common diseases, such as high cholesterol and coronary artery disease, to rare diseases like Long QT Syndrome, hypertrophic cardiomyopathy, and vascular diseases.  Genetic counselors who specialize in cardiovascular disease have developed skills specific to the management of and counseling for genetic cardiovascular disorders and practice in both the pediatric and adult setting. Cardiovascular genetic counselors are also integral in local and national efforts to prevent sudden cardiac death, which is the leading cause of sudden death in young people. This is done by identifying patients with known or suspected heritable cardiovascular diseases and promoting cascade family screening or testing of at-risk relatives.

Common referral reasons include:
 Cardiomyopathy, including, hypertrophic cardiomyopathy and familial idiopathic dilated cardiomyopathy
 Arrhythmia, including Long QT syndrome and Brugada syndrome
 Vascular disease, including Marfan syndrome and aortic aneurysm and/or dissection (<50 years old)
 Congenital heart defects (e.g. conotruncal defects, left ventricular outflow tract defects)
 Familial hypercholesterolemia
 Family history of unexplained sudden death

Guidelines on cardiovascular genetics are published by multiple professional societies.

Hereditary cancer genetics 
Cancer genetic counselors see individuals with a personal diagnosis and/or family history of cancer or symptoms of an inherited cancer syndrome. Genetic counselors take a family history and assess for hereditary risk, or risk that can be passed down from generation to generation. If indicated, they can coordinate genetic testing, typically via blood or saliva sample, to evaluate for hereditary cancer risk.  Personalized medical management and cancer screening recommendations can be provided based on results of genetic testing and/or the family history of cancer. While most cancers are sporadic (not inherited), some are more likely to have a hereditary factor, particularly when occurring at young ages or when clustering in families. These include common cancers such as breast, ovarian, colon and uterine cancers, as well as rare tumor types. General referral indications can include, but are not limited to:
 Personal or family history of cancer with unusually young age of onset (e.g. breast cancer under age 45, colon cancer under age 50)
 Diagnosis of a tumor or cancer with a high likelihood to be hereditary (e.g. male breast cancer, triple negative breast cancer, ovarian cancer, metastatic or high-grade prostate cancer, pancreatic cancer, retinoblastoma, adrenocortical carcinoma, pleuropulmonary blastoma, neuroendocrine tumor, medullary thyroid cancer, pheochromocytoma or paraganglioma)
 Personal or family history of bilateral cancers (e.g., both breasts or both kidneys) or multiple primary tumors in one person
 Features associated with an inherited cancer syndrome (e.g. more than 10 adenomatous polyps, rare types of gastrointestinal polyps, such as hamartomatous polyps), or specific skin findings like café au lait macules or freckling on the lips
 Family history of related cancers clustered on the same side of the family (e.g. breast/ovarian, colon/uterine, sarcoma/leukemia/brain)
 Family history of a known inherited cancer syndrome (e.g. hereditary breast and ovarian cancer syndrome, hereditary non-polyposis colorectal cancer, Li-Fraumeni syndrome)
 Individuals of Ashkenazi Jewish ancestry with a personal and/or family history of breast, ovarian, or pancreatic cancer
 Possible germline (inherited) genetic mutation suggested by tumor profile testing

Neurogenetics
Genetic counselors specializing in neurogenetics are involved in the care of individuals who have or are at risk to develop conditions affecting the central nervous system (brain and spinal cord) or peripheral nervous system (the nerves that leave the spinal cord and go to other places in the body, such as the feet and hands, skeletal  muscles, and internal organs). Effects of these conditions can lead to various impairments some examples of which include cognitive decline, intellectual disability, seizures, uncontrolled movements (e.g. ataxia, chorea), muscle weakness, paralysis, or atrophy. Examples of neurogenetic disorders include:
 Brain malformation syndromes, including lissencephaly and polymicrogyria
 Brain tumor predisposition syndromes, including Neurofibromatosis 1 and 2
 Epilepsy (seizures)
 Hereditary motor neuron diseases, including amyotrophic lateral sclerosis (ALS/Lou Gehrig's disease) and spinal muscular atrophy
 Hereditary neuropathies, including Charcot-Marie-Tooth disease
 Intellectual disabilities, developmental delays, and autism spectrum disorder
 Leukodystrophy (hereditary white matter diseases)
 Memory and other cognitive disorders, including Alzheimer disease and frontotemporal dementia
 Movement disorders, including hereditary ataxia, spastic paraplegia, Huntington disease, and Parkinson disease
 Neuromuscular disorders, including muscular dystrophies, congenital myopathies, and congenital myasthenic syndromes

Pediatric genetics 
Pediatric genetic counseling can be indicated for newborns, infants, children and their families. General referral indications can include:  
 Birth defect(s) or multiple congenital anomalies (cleft lip/palate, heart defects, spina bifida)
 Intellectual disability of unknown cause, learning disabilities, or autism
 Sensory impairments (vision, hearing)
 Metabolic disorders (PKU, galactosemia, inborn errors of metabolism)
 Known/Suspected genetic disorders (e.g., Down syndrome, Cystic Fibrosis, Muscular Dystrophy)
 Primary immunodeficiency

Prenatal genetics
Prenatal genetics involves services for women either during or prior to a pregnancy.

General indications for referral to genetic counseling in the preconception or prenatal setting may include, but are not limited to:
 Advanced maternal age (35 years old or older at time of delivery)
 Advanced paternal age
 Current pregnancy with anomalies identified by ultrasound (e.g. increased nuchal translucency measurements)
 Current pregnancy with an abnormal genetic screening test or test result
 Current pregnancy with risk of or concern for maternal exposures, such as medications, radiation, drugs/alcohol, or infections
 Consanguineous union (cousins or otherwise blood related)
 Family history of an inherited genetic condition or chromosome abnormality
 Genetic carrier screening for recessive and/or X-linked diseases
 History of a previous child with a birth defect, developmental delay, or other genetic condition
 History of infertility, multiple unexplained miscarriages or cases of unexplained infant deaths
 Molecular test for single gene disorder

Prenatal genetic counseling may help with the decision-making process by walking patients through examples of what some people might do in similar situations, and their rationale for choosing that option. Decisions made by patients are affected by factors including timing, accuracy of information provided by tests, and risk and benefits of the tests. This discussion enables patients to place the information and circumstances into the context of their own lives, and in the context of their own values. They may choose to undergo noninvasive screening (e.g. ultrasound, triple screen, cell-free fetal DNA screening) or invasive diagnostic testing (amniocentesis or chorionic villus sampling). Invasive diagnostic tests possess a small risk of miscarriage (1–2%) but provide more definitive results. Testing is offered to provide a definitive answer regarding the presence of a certain genetic condition or chromosomal abnormality. Prenatal genetic counseling also comes with ethical concerns both as the parents and as the counselor. It is important to consider all factors that go into the counseling, race, ethnic background, family history, and other significant issues that may arise.

Psychiatric genetics  
Psychiatric genetic counseling is a sub-specialty within genetic counseling focused on helping people living with a psychiatric disorder and/or their family members understand both the genetic and environmental factors that contributed to their illness and address associated emotions such as guilt or self-blame. Genetic counselors also discuss strategies to promote recovery and protect mental health and address any questions on chances for recurrence in other family members. While currently there is no single gene solely responsible for causing a psychiatric disorder, there is strong evidence from family, twin studies, and genome-wide-association studies that both multiple genes and environment interact together. Like other areas of genetic counseling, patients at all different stages of life (pediatric, adult, prenatal) can have psychiatric genetic counseling. Since the etiology of psychiatric disorders is complex and not fully understood, the utility of genetic testing is not as clear as it is in Mendelian or single gene disorders. Research has shown that individuals who receive psychiatric genetic counseling have significant increases in feelings of empowerment and self-efficacy after genetic counseling.

Psychiatric genetic counselors can help "dispel mistaken notions about psychiatric disorders, calm needless anxiety, and help those at risk to draw up a rational plan of action based on the best available information".

Global Genetic Counseling Community
In 2018, there are nearly 7000 genetic counselors practicing worldwide, across at least 28 countries.

China 
Genetic counseling in China (mainland) has been primarily provided by pediatricians or obstetricians for prenatal or birth defect diagnoses. Most genetic tests can only be performed in academic institutions as research tests or in commercial direct-to-consumer companies for non-clinical use.

In China, genetic counseling is steered by the Chinese Board of Genetic Counseling (CBGC), a not-for-profit organization. CBGC is composed of senior experts engaged in genetic education and research. CBGC is committed to establishing standardized procedures of genetic counseling, training qualified genetic counselors, improving health for all, and reducing the incidence of birth defects. CBGC was established in 2015 and is the major professional organization for genetic counselors in mainland China, providing training through short term online and in-person lectures, educational conferences, and certification for trainees.

Genetics education in China began in the 1980s when selected medical schools began offering genetics courses that focused predominantly on molecular genetics and had limited clinical content. At present, there are no official master's level graduate programs in genetic counseling or clinical genetics in China, and there is great variability in the duration and content of genetics curricula among medical schools and professional organizations.

The Chinese Ministry of Health has not yet recognized genetic counselors as an independent health care occupation. There are no official statistics for the number of health care professionals (e.g., physicians, nurses, and lab technicians) who are providing genetic counseling services in China.

South Africa 
Genetic Counselling is a developing field in South Africa. Currently, there are about 20 registered genetic counsellors practicing in the country. In South Africa, genetic counsellors work within academic institutions, in the private health sector and more recently, private genetic laboratories. A few qualified genetic counsellors have been employed outside of the country or in other professions, owing to funding limitations that have impacted employment opportunities, particularly in the academic/public health sector.

The first Genetic Counselling Programme in South Africa started in 1989 at the University of the Witwatersrand in Johannesburg, in the Gauteng province. A second programme started in 2004 at the University of Cape Town in the Western Cape province. These are the only two programmes offering Masters level genetic counselling training in South Africa. Currently these courses are running at full capacity.  This is a two-year degree and includes a research component. The majority of students enter the Masters programme with a science background but those with a psychology background are also considered.

The Health Professions Council of South Africa (HPCSA) requires two years of internship. Often the first year forms part of the master's degree in Genetic Counselling and a further 12-month internship thereafter. Genetic Counsellors are required by law to register with the HPCSA in order to practice as genetic counsellors. At the end of the training period, registrants submit a portfolio to  HPCSA for assessment. If successful, the intern will be registered with the HPCSA and will be able to practice as a Genetic Counsellor in South Africa.

There is a professional organisation for Genetic Counsellors in South Africa, Genetic Counselling South Africa (GC-SA), which provides information and guidance to the HPCSA and others regarding professional issues. The GCSA is a focus group of the South African Society of Human Genetics (SASHG).

Europe 
The profession of genetic counseling is established or developing in more than 11 European countries including Austria, Denmark, France, Ireland, the Netherlands, Norway, Portugal, Romania, Spain, Sweden, Switzerland, and the UK. Genetic counselors (GC) trained in other countries are beginning to establish genetic counseling-related roles in at least 7 more. As of 2018, there were about 900 genetic counselors practicing in Europe. There are at least eight genetic counseling training programs. Formal GC registration occurs through two different programs: in the United Kingdom (UK, via the GCRB as described below) and the European Union via the European Board of Medical Genetics (EBMG). Genetic counselors are not currently recognized as a profession in several European countries including Austria, Belgium, Germany, and Portugal. This is likely due to legal restrictions in these countries, stating genetic counseling is a medical act, and therefore must be conducted by physicians.

Training 
Training programs currently exist in Austria, Italy, France, the Netherlands, Norway, Portugal (currently inactive), Romania (currently inactive), Spain, and the UK. While genetic counselors practice in the following countries, currently no formal genetic counseling programs exist in Belgium, Denmark, Finland, Germany, Greece, Ireland, Sweden, and Switzerland.

Reciprocity (Internationally and Locally) 
Due to the limited Master's level Genetic Counseling programs located in Europe, the EBMG organization recognizes practicing genetic counselors that trained in the US, Canada, South Africa, and Australia. These counselors must possess current registration and/or certification from their home country as well as be working full time in Europe for 1 year to apply for Registration with EBMG.

Professional organizations 
 The Association of Genetic Nurses and Counsellors (AGNC) is the UK's professional organization representing genetic counsellors, genetic nurses and non-medical, patient-facing staff working within the discipline of Clinical Genetics. There are currently (March 2018) 330 AGNC members within the UK. The AGNC is one of the constituent groups of the British Society for Genetic Medicine (BSGM).
 European Board of Medical Genetics (EBMG) developed competencies and standards of practice for GC registration within the European Union (EU).
 The Association of Genetic Counselors (APPAcGen), is working to achieve recognition of the profession of GCs in Portugal.
 The Romanian Association of Genetic Counseling (RAGC) was founded to set national practice standards and lobby for recognition as a distinct health profession. In the meantime, genetic counseling tends to adhere to international organizations' guidelines (e.g., EBMG)
 In Norway there is an "Interest Organization for Genetic Counselors in Norway", which meets yearly.

United Kingdom 
The majority of Genetic Counsellors in the UK work in the National Health Service (NHS) in one of the 33 Regional Clinical Genetics Services (some renamed Genomic Medicine Centres in England), Scotland, Wales or Northern Ireland. Others work in specialist roles in the NHS, education, policy or research. A minority work in the private sector.

Training
The first two-year MSc in Genetic Counselling program established in the UK was from the University of Manchester in 1992, followed by Cardiff University in Wales in 2000. 2016 saw major changes in the way genetic counsellors are trained in England. A 3-year training programme funded by Health Education England, the Scientist Training Programme (STP) uses a combination of work-based training in Genomic Medicine Centres and a part-time MSc in genetics (Genomic Counselling) from the University of Manchester. Recruitment is performed nationally through the National School of Healthcare Science (NSHCS). A 3-year part-time MSc in Genetic and Genomic Counselling is also now delivered by Cardiff University, through blended learning, with most of the teaching delivered online, alongside some short face-to-face teaching blocks in Wales. A 2-year MSc Genetic and Genomic Counselling program began at the University of Glasgow in Scotland in 2016. Prerequisites for acceptance on all the programmes include a degree in a relevant science or a nursing or midwifery qualification, and experience in a caring role.

Credentialing/certification/licensure
Genetic counselling training programmes are accredited by the UK Genetic Counsellor Registration Board (GCRB) and the European Board of Medical Genetics (EBMG). Genetic counsellors in the UK are regulated through the GCRB, although currently GCRB registration is voluntary. The GCRB registry was accredited in 2016 by the Professional Standards Authority under its Accredited Registers programme. Over 200 genetic counsellors are currently registered through the GCRB. Genetic Counsellors trained through the STP programme are expected to be eligible to apply for statutory regulation through the Health Care Professions Council and it is planned that soon there will be equivalence arrangements with the GCRB to ensure statutory regulation for GCRB registered genetic counsellors. In order to be eligible for GCRB credentialing, one of two sets of requirements must be met: completion of a 2-year Master's of Science degree and 2 years of experience as a genetic counselor, or completion of a 3-year combined Master's program and work-based training. In addition, a portfolio including a 50 case logbook, evidence of supervision, case studies, essays, and recorded counseling sessions is required.

In order to be eligible for EBMG credentialing, a Master's of Science in genetic counseling is required, along with a portfolio including a logbook of 50 cases, case studies, references, and reflective essays. Both the EBMG and the GCRB also offer an alternative route to credentialing in which the applicant completes a nursing degree.

Reciprocity (internationally and locally)
The GCRB offers credentialing for internationally trained genetic counselors.

Australia/New Zealand 
There are an estimated 430 GCs and trainees in Australia and New Zealand, where genetic counseling is a patient-centered, psychotherapeutic process. In order to practice as a GC, individuals must first attain a recognized Master's degree, after which time they can practice as an Associate. Then, following at least two years of supervised practice and successful passing of assessment as set by the Australasian Society of Genetic Counsellors' Board of Censors, an individual can then be accredited by the Human Genetics Society of Australasia and registered through the National Alliance of Self Regulating Health Professions as an independent GC. Most GCs practice in public or private hospital settings, but roles in private ambulatory care, genomic diagnostic laboratories, industry, and in academia (teaching and research) are becoming increasingly common. Both public and private healthcare services are available in Australia and New Zealand. Genetic services are offered through the public health system in all states and territories. In the public system, genetic testing is paid for by the State Governments when the test is deemed clinically appropriate by the GC and clinical geneticist. GCs in private practice may also offer genetic testing, which is largely paid for out-of-pocket by the client/patient.

Training 
A one-year graduate diploma program was established in 1995, and a two-year Master's level training program was established in 2008. There are currently two Master's training programs in Australia accredited by the Human Genetics Society of Australasia (HGSA).

Credentialing/certification/licensure 
New graduates practice as an Associate Genetic Counselor under the supervision of a certified genetic counselor and a clinical geneticist. They can submit to the HGSA certification process via a portfolio application after one year of practice. Recertification is currently voluntary and available by completing continuing education units (CEUs).

Reciprocity (internationally and locally) 
Genetic counselors with training from the UK, Europe and Australia are eligible for registration and GCs from other countries are considered on a case-by-case basis.

More information can be found through the Australasian Society of Genetic Counsellors, a special interest group of the Human Genetics Society of Australasia.

North America

Education 
A genetic counselor is an expert with a Master of Science degree in genetic counseling. Programs in North America are accredited by the Accreditation Council for Genetic Counseling (ACGC). There are currently 52 accredited programs in the United States, four accredited programs in Canada, and four programs with the intent to become accredited.  Students enter the field from a variety of disciplines, including biology/biological sciences and social sciences such as psychology. Graduate school coursework includes topics such as human genetics, embryology, ethics, research, and counseling theory and techniques. Clinical training including supervised rotations in prenatal, pediatric, adult, cancer, and other subspecialty clinics, as well as non-patient facing rotations in laboratories. Research training typically culminates in a capstone or thesis project.

State licensure  
As of May 2019, 29 states have passed genetic counselor licensure bills that require genetic counselors to meet a certain set of standards to practice. These states are Alabama, Arkansas, California, Connecticut, Delaware, Georgia, Hawaii, Idaho, Illinois, Indiana, Iowa, Kentucky, Louisiana, Massachusetts, Michigan, Minnesota, Nebraska, New Hampshire, New Jersey, New Mexico, North Dakota, Ohio, Oklahoma, Pennsylvania, South Dakota, Tennessee, Utah, Virginia, and Washington. Almost every other state in the United States is in the process of obtaining genetic counseling licensure.

Although genetic counseling has been established over four decades, the first licenses for genetic counselors were not issued until 2002. Utah was the first state to do so. The American Society of Human Genetics (ASHG) has since encouraged more states to license genetic counselors before they are allowed to practice. ASHG argues that requiring practitioners to go through the necessary training and testing to obtain a license will ensure quality genetic services as well as allow for reimbursement for counselors' services. Laws requiring licensure ensure that "professionals who call themselves genetic counselors are able to properly explain complicated test results that could confuse patients and families making important health decisions".

Reimbursement and recognition 
Insurance companies usually do not reimburse for unlicensed genetic counselors' services. Patients who may benefit from genetic counseling may not be able to afford the service due to the expensive out-of-pocket cost. In addition, licensure allows genetic counselors to be searchable in most insurance companies' databases which gives genetic counselors increased opportunities for earning revenue and clients the opportunity to see "the level of coverage insurers provide for their services".

The Center for Medicare and Medicaid Services (CMS) does not currently recognize genetic counselors as healthcare providers and therefore does not reimburse for genetic counseling services unless they are provided by a physician or nurse practitioner. On June 12, 2019, H.R. 3235 "Access to Genetic Counselor Services Act of 2019," was introduced to the U.S. House of Representatives by U.S. Rep. Dave Loebsack (D-Iowa) and U.S. Rep. Mike Kelly (R-Pennsylvania). H.R. 3235 would authorize CMS to recognize certified genetic counselors as healthcare providers and to cover services furnished by genetic counselors under part B of the Medicare program. Genetic counselors are those licensed by states as such, or, for those in states without licensure, the Secretary of Health and Human Services will set criteria through regulation (likely ABGC certification). Genetic counselors would be paid at 85% of the physician fee schedule. Other providers currently providing genetic counseling services will not be affected by the bill.

Job outlook 
As genetic counseling continues to grow as a branch in the medical field, employment rates of genetic counselors are expected to grow by 21% over the next decade; this statistic suggests that approximately 600 new jobs will become available in the US over this time period.  Graduating from an accredited program with a passing score on the board certification exam increases the job prospect. As of May 2019 the median annual wage for genetic counselors was $81,880; the lowest 10% earning less than $61,310 and the highest 10% earning more than $114,750. This includes the varying industries in this field, such as medial and diagnostic laboratories, offices of physicians, hospitals, and colleges/universities.

Middle East 
Out of the approximate 100 genetic counselors practicing in the Middle East, most are located in Israel and Saudi Arabia, with a few located in Lebanon, Oman, and Turkey. In Israel, licensed genetic counselors must work under the supervision of a medical geneticist.  Most practice in genetics departments in hospital settings, with a few working in industry or research.

Training 
The first training program in Israel started in 1997. There are currently three programs that offer a master's degree in genetic counseling, training 20 students per year. The first training program in Saudi Arabia was a graduate diploma in 2005 with a master's degree being available as of 2015. There are two training programs available in Saudi Arabia with approximately 10 trained genetic counselors graduating per year.

Credentialing/certification/licensure 
The Israeli Ministry of Health offers licensure to genetic counselors in Israel following an exam written one year after their post-graduate work and 85-case logbook. Recertification is not required as licensure is permanent after the exam. Licensure is also offered through the Saudi Commission for Health Specialties (SCFHS) following a panel interview, testing, or oral exam by a medical board; recertification in this country is under review at this time, but all counselors practicing in Saudi Arabia are expected to obtain a license from the SCHS.

Media 
The National Society of Genetic Counselors (NSGC) blog provides information about current topics in genetic testing and genetic counseling.

Public attitude 
Many studies have examined the attitudes of the lay public toward genetic counseling and genetic testing. Barriers to obtaining genetic counseling include lack of understanding of genetics by both patients and healthcare providers, concerns about cost and insurance, and fears of stigma and/or discrimination.

The reach of genetic testing and health equity is expanding due to telephone counseling.  Telephone delivery has proven "less expensive, yielded non-inferior cognitive, minimized psychological distress, facilitated informed decision making, and achieved positive counselor-patient interactions."  As a result, telephone-based genetic counseling and testing are now commonly offered and reimbursed by many insurance companies.

No simple correlation has been found between the change in technology to the changes in values and beliefs towards genetic testing.

Health disparities 
An increase in genetic counseling outreach efforts are needed to intentionally extend opportunities to populations that have been historically underrepresented in the profession to create a more diverse and inclusive workforce and access to services. Given the history of low engagement of under-represented minority populations in both clinical genetic services and genetic research, both of these aspects will be challenged and must be addressed before the benefits of precision medicine will be fully realized.

See also 
 Genomic counseling
 National Society of Genetic Counselors
 Reprogenetics
 Whole genome sequencing
Medical genetics

External links
 Australasian Society of Genetic Counsellors (ASGC)
 National Alliance of Self Regulating Health Professions (NASRHP)

Further reading 
 Alexandra Minna Stern, Telling Genes: The Story of Genetic Counseling in America. Baltimore, MD: Johns Hopkins University Press, 2012

References 

Applied genetics
Medical genetics
Counseling